Melipotes is a genus of bird in the family Meliphagidae. They have an overall dark plumage and extensive yellow, orange or reddish facial skin. The four allopatric species are restricted to the highland forest of New Guinea. The sister of this genus is Macgregoria; a genus where the single species until recently was regarded as a bird-of-paradise.

Species
Melipotes contains the following species:

References

 
Bird genera
Taxa named by Philip Sclater
 
Taxonomy articles created by Polbot